Ida McKinley ( Saxton; June 8, 1847 – May 26, 1907) was the first lady of the United States from 1897 until 1901, as the wife of President William McKinley.

Born to a successful Ohio family, Ida met her future husband and later married him during the early Reconstruction years. She never recovered from losing their daughters as children and remained in a fragile state of health for the rest of her life, including having seizures. During campaigns and while in office, her husband took great care to accommodate her needs, as they were a devoted couple. Ida's ability to fulfill the role of First Lady was nevertheless limited. She was brought further grief by the deaths of her brother and later her husband, as McKinley was assassinated by an anarchist. Ida devotedly visited her husband's resting place daily until her own death.

Early life and marriage 
Ida was born in Canton, Ohio, the elder daughter of James Saxton, a prominent Canton banker, and Katherine DeWalt. In 1855, her father founded Saxton, PA. Her grandfather, John Saxton, in 1815 founded The Repository, the city's first and now only newspaper.  A graduate of Brook Hall Seminary, a finishing school in Media, Pennsylvania, Ida was refined, charming, and strikingly attractive when she met William "Bill" McKinley at a picnic in 1867.  They did not begin courting until after she returned from a Grand Tour of Europe in 1869. While single, she worked for a time as a cashier in her father's bank, a position then usually reserved for men.

William McKinley, aged 27, married Ida Saxton, aged 23, on January 25, 1871, at the First Presbyterian Church in Canton, then still under construction. Following the wedding, performed by the Reverend E. Buckingham and the Reverend Dr. Endsley, the couple attended a reception at the home of the bride's parents and left on an eastern wedding trip.

Illness 
Possessed of a fragile, nervous temperament due to the loss of her mother and two young daughters within a short span of time, Mrs. McKinley broke down. She developed epilepsy and became totally dependent on her husband. Her seizures at times occurred in public; she had one at McKinley's inaugural ball as Governor of Ohio. Although she battled her illness for the rest of her life, she kept busy with her hobby, crocheting slippers, making gifts of literally thousands of pairs to friends, acquaintances and charities, which would auction pairs for large sums.

For her condition, she often took barbiturates, laudanum, and other common sedatives of the time.

Children 
The McKinleys had two daughters. Both died in childhood. They were Katherine "Katie" McKinley (1871–1875) and Ida McKinley (April 1873–August 1873).

Katherine McKinley 

Katie was born on Christmas Day 1871, while her father was still a Canton lawyer. She was adored by her parents, being the center of their universe and the apple of William's eye. In return, she adored him. She was smothered with love by Ida until a second daughter was born in the spring of 1873. Due to the fact that Ida's mother died some two weeks before the birth, the infant, also named Ida, was born following a very difficult delivery, and she died four months later.

Ida was grief-stricken, and she believed that God punished her by killing her daughter. She was deeply affected by this, developed phlebitis and epilepsy, and desperately feared the loss of her first-born child. She demanded that William and Katie shower her with displays of love and affection.  Ida spent hours a day in a darkened room with Katie in her arms, kissing her and weeping. William's brother, Abner, once found Katie swinging on a gate of the garden of her house and invited her to go for a walk with him. The child replied that "if [she] would go out of the yard, God would punish [her] mama some more".

In June 1875, Katie became ill with typhoid fever and died within days. She was initially interred in Canton's West Lawn Cemetery, but, on October 10, 1907, both Katie and her younger sister Ida were exhumed and re-interred in the north wall of the McKinley National Memorial. On the same day, the bodies of Ida and William were re-interred in the same place.

Ida was effectively shattered when Katie died.

First Lady of the United States 

President McKinley took great care to accommodate her condition. In a break with tradition, he insisted that his wife be seated next to him at state dinners rather than at the other end of the table. At receiving lines, she alone remained seated. Many of the social chores normally assumed by the First Lady fell to Mrs. Jennie Tuttle Hobart, wife of Vice President Garret Hobart. Guests noted that whenever Mrs. McKinley was about to undergo a seizure, the President would gently place a napkin or handkerchief over her face to conceal her contorted features.  When it passed, he would remove it and resume whatever he was doing as if nothing had happened.

The President's patient devotion and loving attention was the talk of the capital. "President McKinley has made it pretty hard for the rest of us husbands here in Washington," remarked Senator Mark Hanna.

The First Lady often traveled with the President.  Mrs. McKinley traveled to California with the President in May 1901, but became so ill in San Francisco  that the planned tour of the Northwest was cancelled.  She was also with him on the trip to Buffalo, New York in September of that year when he was assassinated but was not present at the shooting.
On September 6, 1901, President McKinley was shot in the stomach by a 28-year-old anarchist named Leon Czolgosz. Doctors were unable to locate the bullet. The President's wound eventually became infected with gangrene.
He died eight days after the shooting, aged 58.

Later life and death

With the assassination of her husband by Leon Czolgosz in Buffalo, New York in September 1901, Mrs. McKinley lost much of her will to live.  Although she bore up well in the days between the shooting and the president's death, she could not bring herself to attend his funeral.  Her health eroded as she withdrew to the safety of her home and memories in Canton.  She was cared for by her younger sister. The President was interred at the Werts Receiving Vault at West Lawn Cemetery until his memorial was built. Ida visited daily until her own death.  She survived the president by less than six years, dying on May 26, 1907, aged 59.  She was buried next to him and their two deceased daughters in Canton's McKinley Memorial Mausoleum.

Murder of brother George Saxton
Three years before the assassination of her husband, Ida's only brother, well-known bachelor playboy George DeWalt Saxton (1850–1898), was murdered; Ida wept at his graveside. Dressmaker Mrs. Anna "Annie" E. Ehrhart George was accused, then tried 2–24 April 1899. Following nine years of wooing George, and six more indulging in their scandalous affair, Saxton had then requested and financed his lover's divorce from her husband, Sample C. George—who had, in 1892, sued Saxton in the Supreme Court for alienation of affections, settling for $1,850 plus legal costs (after quietly remarrying Lucy Graham)—but he later spurned his conquest. Failing to successfully sue Saxton for breach of promise; the former Mrs. George was accused of fatally shooting him as he approached the home of another woman—an act she had repeatedly threatened. Neither the Saxtons nor the McKinley family attended the trial. The media championed her case; George claimed self-defense and was acquitted of first-degree murder by a jury. No one else was ever charged with the crime. Ehrhart later married Dr. Arthur Cornelius Ridout (1861–1906), reputedly a drunk and a gambler, whose death by hanging from a chandelier was ruled a suicide.

Legacy 

Ida's childhood home, the Saxton House, has been preserved on Market Avenue in Canton. In addition to growing up in the house, she and her husband also lived there from 1878 to 1891, the period during which the future President McKinley served as one of Ohio's Congressional Representatives.  The house was restored to its Victorian splendor and became part of the First Ladies National Historic Site at its dedication in 1998.

References 

 Original text based on White House biography

Bibliography

External links 
 
 
 Ida Mckinley – National First Ladies' Library
Ida McKinley at C-SPAN's First Ladies: Influence & Image

1847 births
1907 deaths
19th-century American women
20th-century American women
First Ladies and Gentlemen of Ohio
First ladies of the United States
Ida Saxton
People from Canton, Ohio
People with epilepsy
Wikipedia articles incorporating text from A Woman of the Century